The Cintractiellaceae are a family of smut fungi in the order Ustilaginales. The family contains two genera and three species. The family was circumscribed by mycologist Kálmán Vánky in 2003.

References

External links

Ustilaginomycotina
Basidiomycota families